Caloptilia selimpat is a moth of the family Gracillariidae. It is known from Pahang, Malaysia.

References

selimpat
Moths of Asia
Moths described in 1993